During the 1995–96 English football season, West Ham United competed in the FA Premier League (known as the FA Carling Premiership for sponsorship reasons).

Season summary
West Ham progressed further following the previous season's 14th-place finish (and last-minute scramble away from relegation danger) and climbed to 10th place in the final table – their best finish since they came third in 1986. They were never in any danger of going down, but they never looked like challenging for a UEFA Cup spot. Nor did they make much of an impact in the cup competitions, though striker Tony Cottee showed little sign of his advancing years, coming joint top scorer with penalty taking left-back Julian Dicks.

Manager Harry Redknapp spent heavily over the summer, mostly on foreign players, in hope of building a West Ham side capable of chasing European qualification and major trophies.

The season also brought the debut of two teenage players - defender Rio Ferdinand and midfielder Frank Lampard.

Final league table

Results
West Ham United's score comes first

Legend

FA Premier League

FA Cup

League Cup

First-team squad
Squad at end of season

Left club during season

Reserve squad

Transfers

In

Out

Transfers in:  £2,430,000
Transfers out:  £4,255,000
Total spending:  £1,825,000

Statistics

Starting 11
Considering starts in all competitions

References

West Ham United F.C. seasons
West Ham United
West Ham United
West Ham United